The Dandong–Xilinhot Expressway, designated as G16 and commonly referred to as the Danxi Expressway is an expressway that connects the cities of Dandong, Liaoning, China, and Xilinhot, Inner Mongolia. When fully complete, it will be  in length.

Currently, the expressway is complete between Dandong and Baarin Right Banner.

References

Chinese national-level expressways
Expressways in Liaoning
Expressways in Inner Mongolia